National Catfish Day is a national observance of the United States celebrating "the value of farm-raised catfish." The day was designated as June 25, 1987, by President Ronald Reagan, who issued the Presidential Proclamation after the U.S. Congress called for the day to be established in House Joint Resolution 178.

The text of the Proclamation
Proclamation 5672 — National Catfish Day, 1987
June 25, 1987
By the President of the United States of America
A Proclamation
More and more Americans are discovering a uniquely American food delicacy — farm-raised catfish. In 1986, catfish comprised the third highest volume of finned fish consumed in the United States.
Ninety-nine percent of all these catfish were farm-raised. Between 1975 and 1985, production of farm-raised catfish increased by 1200 percent. Most observers expect that production will continue to increase in 1987. Production costs of catfish farming, which have averaged only 65 cents per pound over the past 8 years, have resulted in a stable income for growers and an economical food product for consumers. The accompanying growth of the catfish processing industry also has created thousands of permanent jobs.
Farm-raised catfish have come a long way from their bottom-feeding ancestors. The catfish that are available today, fresh or frozen in markets nationwide, are products of state-of-the-art methods of  aquaculture. They thrive in clean freshwater ponds on many American farms, where they are surface-fed soybean meal, corn, fish meal, vitamins, and minerals. Farm-raised catfish not only furnish American consumers with a tasty delicacy but also provide a nutritious, low-calorie source of protein that is also low in cholesterol.
In recognition of the value of farm-raised catfish, the Congress, by House Joint Resolution 178, has designated June 25, 1987, as "National Catfish Day" and authorized and requested the President to issue a proclamation in its observance.
Now, Therefore, I, Ronald Reagan, President of the United States of America, do hereby proclaim June 25, 1987, as National Catfish Day. I call upon the people of the United States to observe this day with appropriate ceremonies and activities.
In Witness Whereof, I have hereunto set my hand this twenty-fifth day of June, in the year of our Lord nineteen hundred and eighty-seven, and of the Independence of the United States of America the two hundred and eleventh.
Ronald Reagan
[Filed with the Office of the Federal Register, 4:13 p.m., June 25, 1987]

See also
 List of food days

External links
 National Catfish Day — Information from Holiday Insights

References

Observances in the United States
June observances
Observances about food and drink
Siluriformes